Bailu Township is a township under the administration of Chongren County, Jiangxi, China. , it has 8 villages under its administration.

References 

Township-level divisions of Jiangxi
Chongren County